Magnet Academy for Cultural Arts (MACA) is a magnet high school, with focus on cultural arts, located in Opelousas, Louisiana, United States. It started in the 2005–2006 school year with only 7th, 8th and 9th grades, with a new grade being added every year until the 2008–2009 school year, when 12th grade was reached. The first graduating class graduated in May 2009. The principal since the 2012–2013 school year is Karen Olivier. In the 2009–2010 school year MACA had its first sports league, "Intramural sports". The school has six talent areas: art, dance, band, vocals, theater, and creative writing.

References

External links

Public middle schools in Louisiana
Public high schools in Louisiana
Schools in St. Landry Parish, Louisiana
Magnet schools in Louisiana
Opelousas, Louisiana
Educational institutions established in 2005
2005 establishments in Louisiana